Euchloe tagis, the Portuguese dappled white, is a butterfly in the family Pieridae.

It ranges through southern Europe where it is found from Portugal to northwestern Italy and northern Africa (there are local populations in Morocco and Algeria).

The imago has a black apical patch spotted with white on the forewing upperside, and a black discoid macula. The underside of the hind wings is gray-green, studded with white spots of variable extent. 

This species is found in local, discrete populations limited to fairly small areas of suitable habitat which is invariably made of calcareous outcrops with Mediterranean scrubland where the food plants, crucifers of the genus Iberis are found.

The species flies from February to June, in a single generation. It winters at the chrysalis stage.

External links
Moths and Butterflies of Europe and North Africa
European Butterflies by Matt Rowlings
Image of Euchloe tagis on Iberis by Eduardo Marabuto
Image of Euchloe tagis caterpillar by Eduardo Marabuto

Euchloe
Butterflies of Europe
Butterflies described in 1804
Taxa named by Jacob Hübner